Eka Basunga Lokonda "Émile" Mpenza (born 4 July 1978) is a Belgian former footballer who played as a striker. He has been capped at international level by Belgium. His older brother, Mbo, also represented Belgium.

Club career

Belgium, Germany and Qatar
Mpenza started his career at K.V. Kortrijk, and then moved to R.E. Mouscron and Standard Liège in quick succession, with older brother Mbo playing alongside in all three clubs. In 2000, he moved to Bundesliga side FC Schalke 04, in an exchange with Michaël Goossens. At Schalke he was very successful together with his compatriot Marc Wilmots and other striker Ebbe Sand but they failed to win the German title on the last day of competition. Mpenza returned to Standard three years later. In 2004–05 he returned to Germany, signing for Hamburger SV. However, in January 2006 he made a surprise move to Qatari team Al Rayyan.

Manchester City
Mpenza signed for Manchester City, after playing and scoring in a specially arranged match at Eastlands on 14 February 2007. "I am not finished and I will prove it in Manchester", Mpenza told Belgian radio station Bel RTL. "I make this move as revenge, with respect to all those who criticised my decision to play in Qatar". He made his debut against Wigan Athletic on 3 March 2007 as a half-time substitute replacing Georgios Samaras. He scored his first goal for the club in the 2–0 win at Middlesbrough on 17 March 2007, and his second in the 1–0 victory at Newcastle United on 30 March. He scored once more in the 2006–07 season, away to Tottenham Hotspur on the last day of the season, as City lost 2–1.

Having signed until the end of the 2007–08 season, Mpenza scored on City's first pre-season game of the 2007–08 season away to Doncaster Rovers. He would also equalise against Fulham and put City ahead against Bristol City and Newcastle United. However, facing competition for his place from Rolando Bianchi, Valeri Bojinov, Geovanni and Elano, all signed by new City manager Sven-Göran Eriksson in summer 2007, Mpenza did not score again after September, and was released in July 2008.

Plymouth Argyle
He then signed for Championship side Plymouth Argyle on 2 September 2008. Mpenza went on to make his Argyle debut as a sub on 70 minutes in a 2–1 defeat to Norwich City on 13 September. He then scored his first goal for the club against Charlton Athletic in a 2–2 draw, and scored again in a 2–1 win over Cardiff City. However Mpenza's time at Plymouth Argyle was blighted by injury and therefore he was not offered a new contract.

Sion
For the 2009–10 season,  Mpenza signed a one-year contract with Swiss Topflight club FC Sion. Here he rediscovered his eye for goal by scoring 21 goals in 32 matches.

Neftchi Baku
In August 2010, Mpenza signed a three-year contract with Azerbaijan Premier League club Neftchi Baku. He left the club in January 2012, having lost his place in the team during the 2011–12 season.

In June 2015, Neftchi Baku were ordered by FIFA to pay Mpenza €1 million in unpaid wages.

Eendracht Aalst
After searching a club for over a year, Mpenza finally signed a one-year contract with Eendracht Aalst on 1 October 2013.

International career
Mpenza played for the Belgium national football team between 1997 and 2009, though he was frequently injured in times of international call-ups. He played alongside his brother Mbo in the 1998 World Cup and in Euro 2000 where he scored a goal in the opening match against Sweden (which ended with Belgium's victory 2–1), but missed out on the World Cup in 2002 with a groin injury.

Career statistics

International goals

Honours

Club
Schalke 04
 DFB-Pokal: 2000–01, 2001–02

Hamburger SV
 UEFA Intertoto Cup: 2005

Neftchi Baku
 Azerbaijan Premier League: 2010–11

Individual
 Belgian Young Professional Footballer of the Year: 1996–97
 Belgian Ebony Shoe: 1997
 Best Belgian Footballer Abroad: 2000
 kicker German Football Rankings - International Class Player: 2000-01
 Standard Liège Man of the Season: 2003–04

References

External links
 
 
 

1978 births
Footballers from Brussels
Living people
Belgian people of Democratic Republic of the Congo descent
Association football forwards
Belgian footballers
Belgium international footballers
Belgian expatriate footballers
Belgian expatriate sportspeople in Germany
Belgian expatriate sportspeople in Qatar
Belgian expatriate sportspeople in England
Belgian expatriate sportspeople in Switzerland
Expatriate footballers in England
Expatriate footballers in Germany
Expatriate footballers in Qatar
Expatriate footballers in Switzerland
Expatriate footballers in Azerbaijan
K.V. Kortrijk players
Royal Excel Mouscron players
Standard Liège players
FC Schalke 04 players
Hamburger SV players
Ząbkovia Ząbki players
Al-Rayyan SC players
Manchester City F.C. players
Plymouth Argyle F.C. players
FC Sion players
S.C. Eendracht Aalst players
Neftçi PFK players
Belgian Pro League players
Challenger Pro League players
Bundesliga players
Premier League players
English Football League players
Swiss Super League players
Qatar Stars League players
Azerbaijan Premier League players
1998 FIFA World Cup players
UEFA Euro 2000 players
Black Belgian sportspeople